Lawrence Municipal Airport  is two miles east of Lawrence, in Essex County, Massachusetts, United States. It is owned by the City of Lawrence, though it is in North Andover.

Northeast DC-3s stopped at Lawrence from 1946 to 1965; from 1952 to 1960, it rated nonstops to New York La Guardia.

The airport is home to the Essex County Composite Squadron of the Civil Air Patrol.

Facilities
Fuel is offered by four fixed-base operators.

In the year ending September 1, 2006 the airport had 83,200 aircraft operations, average 227 per day: 85% general aviation, 13% air taxi, 1% military. 234 aircraft are based at the airport: 86% single-engine, 11% multi-engine, 2% helicopter and <1% jet.

Aviation services
Angel Flight New England is a nonprofit, 501(c)(3) tax exempt corporation that provides free air transportation on private aircraft for patients, as well as blood, organs, and tissues/donors.
Eagle East Aviation is an owner-operated fixed-base operator (FBO) located at the southwest side of the airport. Eagle East offers a large array of services designed to cater to the aspiring pilot on up to corporate jets.
Four Star Aviation is a family-operated FBO located on the west side of the airport. Four Star Aviation specializes in providing fuel and services to jet operators, as well as piston/turboprop aircraft (airplanes and helicopters), aircraft maintenance, and aircraft sales. Four Star Aviation offers the only self-serve 100LL fueling station on the airport, available 24 hours a day, seven days a week. Four Star Aviation hosts the North Andover Flight Academy and MBM Helicopters, specializing in helicopter training and maintenance.
Falcon Air Inc. offers fueling, oxygen, parking, aircraft maintenance, aircraft modifications, aircraft parts, and aircraft sales/leasing/brokerage services.

Dining
Opened in 2014, Dominic's Diner, located in the terminal, serves breakfast and lunch.

References

External links 
 Lawrence Municipal Airport, official site
 Four Star Aviation, a fixed-base operator (FBO)
 Falcon Air, a fixed-base operator
 Eagle East Aviation, a fixed-base operator
 Dominic's Diner
 
 

Lawrence, Massachusetts
Airports in Essex County, Massachusetts
Buildings and structures in Lawrence, Massachusetts